Cidade Velha (Portuguese for "old city", also: Santiago de Cabo Verde) is a city in the southern part of the island of Santiago, Cape Verde. Founded in 1462, it is the oldest settlement in Cape Verde and its former capital. Once called Ribeira Grande, its name was changed to Cidade Velha in the late 18th century. It is the seat of the Ribeira Grande de Santiago municipality.

Located off Africa's northwest coast, this town was the first European colonial settlement in the tropics. Some of the meticulously planned original design of the site is still intact, including a royal fortress, two churches and a 16th-century town square. Today, Cidade Velha is an Atlantic shipping stop and center for Creole culture. The city became a UNESCO World Heritage Site and one of the Seven Wonders of Portuguese Origin in the World in 2009.

Geography
Cidade Velha is situated on the south coast of Santiago, at the mouth of the river Ribeira Grande de Santiago. City subdivisions include Largo Pelourinho, São Sebastião, Santo António and São Pedro.

History

The island of Santiago was discovered by António da Noli, a Genoese in Portuguese service, in 1460. Da Noli settled at Ribeira Grande with his family members and Portuguese from Algarve and Alentejo in 1462. The settling conditions were good due to the abundance of water from the river Ribeira Grande, which gave it an advantage over the other settlement on Santiago, Alcatrazes. The settlement became a key port of call for Portuguese colonisation towards Africa and South America. In the 16th and 17th centuries, it was a centre of maritime trade between Africa, the Cape, Brazil and the Caribbean. Due to its proximity to the African coast, it was an essential platform for the trade of enslaved persons.

Cidade Velha's port was a stopping place for two great navigators: Vasco da Gama, in 1497, on his way to India, and Christopher Columbus, in 1498, while on his third voyage to the Americas. In 1522, it was the stopping place for the later explorer Ferdinand Magellan's expedition, under Spain on the final leg of the survivors circumnavigation the world.

Cidade Velha has the oldest colonial church in the world - Nossa Senhora do Rosário church, which was constructed in 1495. In 1533, Cidade Velha became the seat of the new Roman Catholic Diocese of Santiago de Cabo Verde, created by papal bull of Pope Clement VII. Currently, the seat is in Praia.

The riches of Ribeira Grande and conflicts between Portugal and rival colonial powers France and Britain attracted pirate attacks, including those by Francis Drake (1585) and Jacques Cassard (1712). Despite the construction of Forte Real de São Filipe in 1587–93, Ribeira Grande remained vulnerable and went into decline. The capital was moved to Praia in 1770.

Ribeira Grande (now Cidade Velha) was reduced to the rank of a village and its civil, religious and military buildings went in decay. Since the 1960s, restoration works have begun. In 2009, it became a UNESCO World Heritage Site.

Demography

Sites of interest
Pelourinho (Pillory), erected in 1512 or 1520. At this marble pillar rebellious slaves were punished publicly. It was restored in the 1960s. It stands at the main square of the city. 
Forte Real de São Filipe, constructed in 1587–93. This fort was built as defence from pirate attacks (mainly French and English). The elevation is 120 m above sea level.
Nossa Senhora do Rosário church, the oldest colonial church in the world, built in 1495. It has a side chapel in Manueline Gothic style.
the ruined Sé Cathedral, construction started in 1556 and completed in 1705, pillaged in 1712. Its impressive ruins (the church was 60 m long) have been conserved in 2004.
the ruined convent of São Francisco, built in 1657 on a slope outside the city centre. The convent church has been restored in 2002.
many traditional houses can be found along the streets rua Banana and rua Carreira.

Climate
Cidade Velha has a hot arid climate (Köppen BWh). The coolest month is January (average ) and the hottest is October (average ).

Gallery

References 

Cities in Cape Verde
Ribeira Grande de Santiago
Municipal seats in Cape Verde
Geography of Santiago, Cape Verde
Populated places established in the 1460s
World Heritage Sites in Cape Verde
1462 establishments
15th-century establishments in Cape Verde